Amanda Adams (born September 12, 1976) is an American author and archaeologist. She is also a former fashion model and was featured in the 1996 Buffalo Jeans campaign.

Biography
She attended University of California, Berkeley, Department of Anthropology in the late 1990s and completed her degree with the Kroeber prize. She then obtained a master's degree in archaeology from the University of British Columbia, Vancouver. Her thesis was titled Visions Cast on Stone, abstracts were published in the journal The Midden.

Adams' first book. A Mermaid's Tale, was about mermaid legends from around the world. It received a starred review in Booklist.  Her second book, Ladies of the Field, details the adventurous lives of early, female archaeologists.

Publications

References

Further reading 
 Booklist STARRED review; September 15, 2006
 Visions Cast in Stone: The Petroglyphs of Gabriola Island, B.C. The Midden 216(2):2-9. Publication of the Archaeological Society of British Columbia

External links
  "Hot 20 Under 40" for San Francisco
 Dmpibooks.com
 Globe and Mail Review of Books; September 2, 2006
 Sciencecareers.sciencemag.org

1976 births
Living people
American women non-fiction writers
American women archaeologists
UC Berkeley College of Letters and Science alumni
21st-century American women writers
21st-century American non-fiction writers
21st-century American archaeologists
University of British Columbia alumni